Kent Salfi (born July 10, 1971 in Camden, New Jersey) is a retired American-born Austrian ice hockey player who last played for HC TWK Innsbruck of the Austrian Hockey League.

Career
After spending four seasons in the University of Maine, Salfi played in Sweden for Mora IK where he spent two seasons.  He then moved to ETC Timmendorfer Strand of Germany's 2nd Bundesliga for one season before moving to Austria and signed with EC VSV in 1996. In 1997 he had a brief spell in Italy's Serie A with Asiago, playing just three games for them before returning to VSV. He remained with the team until 2003 when he joined EHC Black Wings Linz. In 2008, Salfi joined HC TWK Innsbruck.

On 23 August 2010, Salfi announced his official retirement.

International career
Salfi became a naturalised Austrian citizen and represented the Austrian national team in the 2002 Winter Olympics. He also played in the 2002 IIHF World Championship and the 2003 IIHF World Championship.

Career statistics

References

External links

1971 births
American men's ice hockey centers
Asiago Hockey 1935 players
Austrian ice hockey centres
EC VSV players
EHC Black Wings Linz players
HC TWK Innsbruck players
Ice hockey players from New Jersey
Ice hockey players at the 2002 Winter Olympics
Living people
Maine Black Bears men's ice hockey players
Mora IK players
Olofströms IK players
Olympic ice hockey players of Austria
Sportspeople from Camden, New Jersey
NCAA men's ice hockey national champions